The William Dillard Homestead is a historic homestead property in rural northeastern Stone County, Arkansas.  It is located on the Round Bottom area northeast of Mountain View, on a plateau above the river's flood plain.  It consists of two log structures, both now used as barns, that were built c. 1837, and are the oldest standing structures in the county.  A single-pen log cabin stands on rough stone piers, and is covered by a gable roof.  The walls are rough-hewn logs, joined by V notches.  A shed-roof ell extends on the southern side of the structure, and more modern box-constructed sheds are attached to the north and east sides.  A double crib barn stands across the road from the cabin.

The property was listed on the National Register of Historic Places in 1985.

See also
National Register of Historic Places listings in Stone County, Arkansas

References

Houses on the National Register of Historic Places in Arkansas
Houses completed in 1837
Houses in Stone County, Arkansas
National Register of Historic Places in Stone County, Arkansas